Lazar Saric is a television writer, songwriter, producer, and director.

Career

He is well known for working on shows that were created by another television producer, Scott Fellows, as a writer, producer, and director on Ned's Declassified School Survival Guide, Johnny Test as a story writer, Big Time Rush as a writer and producer, then moved on to co-executive producer later on in the series. He wrote episodes of 100 Things To Do Before High School and Supernoobs. He also served as a producer, writer, and director in the 2003 film Killer Drag Queens on Dope. He also wrote for Curious George.

Filmography

Film

Television

References

External links
 https://www.imdb.com/name/nm1335624/?ref_=fn_al_nm_1

Year of birth missing (living people)
Living people
American television writers
American screenwriters
American male songwriters
American people of Serbian descent
American male television writers